Inkpen Hill is a summit in Berkshire, England, with a maximum elevation of . It lies between Walbury Hill, the county top of Berkshire, to the east and Ham Hill to the west. Parts of the hill lie within the Inkpen and Walbury Hills SSSI.

Inkpen Hill is accessible on foot from a car park on a minor road just to the west of Walbury Hill, by a byway that passes by Combe Gibbet before reaching the summit of Inkpen Hill. The Test Way long distance footpath passes along this byway, on its way from Walbury Hill to Eling in Hampshire. A triangulation pillar stands near to, although curiously not at, the summit of the hill, whilst a dew pond, known as Wigmoreash Pond, lies between the summit and Combe Gibbet.

The hill lies within the civil parishes of Inkpen (which includes the summit), Combe  and Buttermere. Inkpen and Combe are both within the unitary authority area of West Berkshire and the ceremonial county of Berkshire, whilst Buttermere is in the unitary authority area and ceremonial county of Wiltshire.

References

Hills of Berkshire